Neporadza may refer to several places in Slovakia.

Neporadza, Rimavská Sobota District
Neporadza, Trenčín District